Mathematics is a field of knowledge.

Mathematics may also refer to:

Music
 Mathematics (album), a 1985 album by Melissa Manchester
 "Mathematics" (Cherry Ghost song), a song by Cherry Ghost
 "Mathematics" (Mos Def song), a song by Mos Def
 Mathematics, an EP by The Servant
 "Mathematics", a song by bbno$
 "Mathematics", a song by Little Boots from Hands
"Mathematics", a song by Macintosh Plus from Floral Shoppe

Other uses
 Mathematics (producer), a hip hop producer
 Mathematics (UIL), an American student mathematics competition
 Microsoft Mathematics, an educational program designed for Microsoft Windows
 Mathematics Magazine, a publication of the Mathematical Association of America

See also 
 Math (disambiguation)
 Mathematica (disambiguation)
 :Category:Mathematics
 Portal:Mathematics